Belasco is a surname. Notable people with the surname include:

 David Belasco (1853–1931), playwright
 David James (David Belasco, 1839–1893), English comic actor
 Jay Belasco (1888–1949), American film actor
 Leon Belasco (1902–1988), Russian-American musician and actor
 Lionel Belasco (1881–1967), composer and bandleader
 Nic Belasco (born 1973), professional basketball player
 Walter Belasco (1864–1939, Vancouver, Canada - 1939, San Francisco), Canadian silent film actor